Mowmenabad (also Romanized as Mow’menābād and Mowmenābād; also known as Mo’menābād) is a village in Kuh Panj Rural District, in the Central District of Bardsir County, Kerman Province, Iran. At the 2006 census, its population was 170, in 40 families.

References 

Populated places in Bardsir County